The dark-backed mulch-slider (Lerista tridactyla) is a species of skink found in Western Australia.

References

Lerista
Reptiles described in 1990
Taxa named by Glen Milton Storr